Ama Khel is a village in Tank District of Khyber Pakhtunkhwa province of Pakistan. It is one of the 16 union councils in Tank District.
Nandoor village is sub village of amakhel.

Four great nations live here.

1- Sahibzai
2- Astan khel
3- Mian khel
4- bary khel

Overview 
Ama Khel is located in Tank District. Nearby villages are Mullazai, Sherbati, Pai and Gul Imam. Ama Khel also has Government Degree College, which is established in 2011 and regular classes are started in 2013. And Also Has Govt Girls Higher Secondary School . 

Prominent people hailing from Amakhel area are Pir Sabir Shah who became MNA of Dera Ismail Khan after defeating ex-Chief Minister Sardar Inayat Ullah Gandapur in 1985 elections. He is a columnist at daily The Frontier Post and member of Youth Parliament for the session 2015–16.

According to the 2017 population census, the population of Ama Khel, Tank is 14,903.

Amakhel District 
 Tank District

References 

Tank District
Populated places in Tank District
Union Councils of Tank District